Johann von Soest was a German painter active in Westphalia during the fifteenth century.  He is sometimes associated with the Master of the Lippborg Passion.

Year of birth missing
Year of death missing
15th-century German painters
German male painters